The Japanese light novel, manga, and anime series Shakugan no Shana features an extensive cast of characters created by Yashichiro Takahashi and Noizi Ito.

Main characters

Yuji Sakai

 is just an average high school student. However, his world is turned upside down when he discovers that he is already dead and does not have much time before he disappears. Unlike normal torches, the treasure inside him restores his Power of Existence every night at midnight.

With the Midnight Lost Child, Yuji has the possibility to live on like an average human as long as he makes sure that his power of existence does not run out before midnight. Due to Midnight Lost Child, no one is sure if Yuji will age like a regular human or be immortal as he is. Since the Midnight Lost Child restores his power of existence, Yuji is training to use that power in the hopes of fighting alongside Shana. In the second season of the anime, it is mentioned that Yuji's power of existence can rival that of a Lord of the Crimson Realm in terms of quantity because the power was altered by The Master Throne, Hecate.

Even when Yuji is ignorant of the fact that he possessed the Midnight Lost Child in the first episodes of the first season of Shakugan no Shana, Yuji develops a somewhat optimistic, yet ultimately fatalistic view of his life. Even when he believed he was slated to perish as a Torch, Yuji took the information in a stride after the initial shock, and did not seem too disturbed or melancholy with the idea that everyone would simply forget about him, accepting this. Rather, his acts of heroism, demonstrated often in the series, is justified by his belief that even if his existence would one day disappear, his sacrifice would be proof that he had once lived.

Although Yuji initially lacks the training and discipline of a Flame Haze, he has demonstrated an admirable amount of intelligence and logic, often thinking outside the box and solving puzzles others can not (though he is still totally clueless to the fact that Shana loves him and is often jealous of any girls who get too close to him). While many Flame Hazes and Lords of the Crimson Realm would be deceived or confused by unconventional casting of magic, Yuji is able to quickly deduce and see through the ploys despite his unfamiliarity with many magical spells, enabling his allies, generally Shana, to strike at the heart of their opposition. Furthermore, by the start of the second season, Yuji's training has enabled him to anticipate as well as dodge a good majority of attacks even from Flame Hazes as skilled as Shana and Wilhelmina, and he has gained the ability to cast Power of Unrestraint. He also has the ability to wield Blutsauger and infusing it with some of his own power. He also can create his own fire, which is silver in color, to fire at targets.

When Yuji first activates the Fuzetsu on his own, the presence of the silver flames is an omen of The Snake of the Festival's return into the world, for the silver flames were a tool created by the  himself to collect elements necessary for his revival. It is revealed that two entities are locked inside Yuji's treasure. One is Johan, the lover of Pheles who created the Treasure for him. The other is "The Snake of the Festival", the Crimson Lord with the black flame and silver shadow who is one of the true gods of the Crimson World and is the founder/true leader of the Bal Masqué. He is later reborn and merges with Yuji, whom he honors by demanding that his subordinates refer to him as their new leader. Later, Pheles' second attempt to free Johan causes the Bal Masque's god to awaken. As both entities have merged into one, it is hard to distinguish which actions are based on Yuji's will and which are the Snake's, sometimes leaving his allies and enemies confused about his true intentions.

Upon learning of Chigusa's pregnancy, Kantaro reveals that Yuji actually had an older twin brother who died at birth. Thus, in memory of their first baby, they named the second baby Yuji, which means "second (child) who shall live long". Yuji is a kind person who puts others before himself. This often causes Shana much confusion and annoyance, as in her experience other Torches exhibited selfish attitudes. At the same time Yuji's compassion and empathy sow the seeds of attraction between him and Shana, and surprisingly, also the reason for their separation, as both Yuji and Sairei no Hebi's main objective is to create a new world between the Human Realm and the Crimson Realm named "Xanadu" in which the Crimson Denizens and Lords can live peacefully without interfering on both worlds, and thus ending the conflict between the Flame Hazes and Bal Masqué. This plan is opposed by Shana and her allies who fear that an eventual collapse of Xanadu would further degrade the balance between the worlds.

In the final battle, Yuji brings out his very own Unrestricted Spell which looks like a collection of clear crystals and has been used primarily as a shield, but its versatility is bound only by Yuji's will and has even been witnessed to be used as a means of teleportation. When Lamia enters Xanadu after fulfilling his wish, she grants Yuji a new Unrestricted Spell, Grammatica. He then asks Yuji to ponder upon its name and meaning. In the end when Yuji accepts Shana's feelings and the two kiss, Grammatica activates restoring Yuji's existence, so that Yuji is no longer a Torch. With the help of another spell from Lamia, Yuji successfully restores all of the humans in Misaki City whose existence was absorbed by the Denizens before he and Shana depart for Xanadu together.

Shana

 is the female lead of the show and calls herself a "Flame Haze" who hunts the "Guze no Tomogara", creatures from another world. She was formerly human (but as stated in the novels and manga, that once a human makes a contract with a crimson lord, they become a Flame Haze and live forever). Her nickname is the  Initially she is concentrated solely on her duty as a Flame Haze, going as far as to not bearing even a name. She sees Yuji only as a Torch, an object, marginally interesting because of his status as a Mystes. Yuji, in his need to humanize her, chose to name her "Shana" after her katana. However, she slowly opens up to Yuji, coming to think of him as a person, despite being a Torch, and eventually comes to love him. Until she met Yuji, she was identified by only her Flame Haze title "Flame-Haired Burning-Eyed Hunter," or her nodachi, . Shana has a habit of saying "Urusai! Urusai! Urusai!" ("Shut up! Shut up! Shut up!") whenever Yuji asks her questions or makes remarks that disturb her original world view or embarrass her. But in reality, they really care for each other. She has a great fondness for sweets, especially melon bread. Shana is shown to be highly intelligent in the series; she got a perfect score on every exam and is talented in Phys. Ed. She is shown, however, to be naive when it comes to social affairs, once even unabashedly asking "how babies are made".

Shana is clearly a powerful and talented Flame Haze, and is said to be the most powerful Flame Haze, known and feared by most Tomogara by title alone. This has allowed her to defeat many powerful Tomogara along the plot, and permits her many different abilities, including her proficiency with the Nietono no Shana, the ability to wield flame, manipulate the power of existence, harbor extrasensory traits, and fly with wings of flame. In the third volume of the manga, the first volume of the light novel, and the film, Alastor states that the reason why she did not explode after being shot by Friagne's Trigger Happy was because she held a capacity that existed in dimensional space, who was able to contain the Flame of Heaven's and has thus stated her as "The Great One". Her duty initially made her indifferent towards human life, but through Yuji's influence, Shana has opened up slightly, although she still remains confused and disgruntled by some human traits which she considers as pointless, although some of it is used to mask her jealousy of her desired monopoly on Yuji.

Despite being the title character of the anime, Shana has few character relations with many of the characters in the show. Her main social interest is Yuji, whom she sees as her love interest, which she admits in the end of season one and multiple times in season two. Her relationship with Yuji is one of the driving forces of the series. Shana takes orders and advice from the Crimson Lord she is bond to, Alastor, and has a mentor and guardian in the form of Wilhelmina Carmel. Kazumi Yoshida is her love-rival for Yuji, and Shana treats her with contempt and disdain. She generally treats most other characters with ignorance and indifference, with the exception of Chigusa Sakai, who she looks to as a source in answering certain difficulties when Alastor or Wilhelmina are unable to do so. Shana eventually starts to be more open to the other characters, especially in regards to her relationship with Kazumi becoming more friendly. After Yuji and Shana's final battle, Yuji admits his loss he replied to Shana, he ask for her forgiveness, ask her to be with him in Xanadu and she accepts happily.

Alastor

 is the Lord of the Crimson Realm to whom Shana is bound. He is known as the  He expresses his will through a divine vessel called the Cocytus, which (in Shana's case) takes the form of a pendant. Alastor is considered to be one of the strongest of all Lords or Denizens; in fact, being one of the true Gods of the Crimson Realm. But even so, he tries to keep the Denizens from consuming Power of Existence. This method is his Flame Haze's last resort, as prior to Shana, no Flame Haze had survived after using it. Alastor and Shana seem to have a parent-child dynamic at first, but Alastor is aware that Shana must grow up and may be trying to adapt.

Snake of the Festival

 is a powerful Lord of Crimson Realm who leads the organization Crimson Denizens known as Bal Masqué and is contracted to his one-time contractor Yuji Sakai. He is in fact one of the True Gods of the Crimson Realm - known as the God of Creation. Although he has a kind and noble side that he shows to his comrades and subjects he can be cruel - willing do anything to make his plans come to fruition. He also showed wisdom when he acknowledged Yuji's philosophies and understood them. According to Yuji he is quite talkative when it comes to granting peoples wishes.

In far past, Snake of the Festival received many prayers from Denizens to create the world for themselves. He answered those wishes by launching the ritual to build a small, bounded world called the Great Chained (大縛鎖 Daibakusa) which was to be a living paradise for Denizens on the world. But the process required a great number of human lives (using their Power of Existence) to complete, and the ancient Flame Hazes, including Tis and Khamsin, intercepted and disrupted the ritual thus creating the massive distortion that backfired upon the body of Snake of the Festival and sealed him inside the rift between two worlds.

Saiki Reisō summons his power over "Creation" and "Settlement" to create anything. Like all other summonings of Gods, it the spell requires a sacrifice. This Divine Summoning is used for the creation of Xanadu, and Hecate was the required sacrifice.

Humans

Misaki High School students

Kazumi is Yuji's classmate. She has a crush on Yuji, but is a bit too shy to tell him directly. In the first season, she spends most of her screen time remaining ignorant of Shana's true nature and her actual relationship with Yuji. When Shana became her love-rival, she vowed to tell Yuji her feelings and to let him decide between her and Shana.

These state of affairs, however, changed after her chance meeting with Khamsin Nbh'w, a Flame Haze, who requested her assistance in his tuning of the distortions in the city. After revealing the truth of the world to her, Khamsin provided Kazumi an eyeglass which can detect Torches after he realized Kazumi was worried if Yuji was a Torch. Kazumi decided to test the eyeglass on Yuji during the Misago Festival, and was horrified to discover that Yuji was indeed a Torch. However, as the battle with Bal Masque raged on, Yuji revealed that, with the Reiji Maigo, he would not disappear, and Kazumi eventually accepted that near the end of the season.

Kazumi carries a small relic provided to her by Khamsin during their first meeting, permitting her to move within a Fuzetsu. Yuji became aware of this in the second season. Also, it is revealed that Pheles gave Kazumi a cross-shaped treasure tool, which would summon Pheles if there was any trouble happening to Yuji/Johan. The catch was that it would take all of Kazumi's power of existence, if she used it. In the sixteenth volume of the light novels, Kazumi is currently in a state of shock after being rejected by Yuji. In the final battle in Misaki City in the third season, during the creation of Xanadu, Kazumi uses the treasure tool to summon Pheles to stop the fight between Yuji and Shana but somehow, she survives. In Kazumi's dream, Pheles is sleeping in Johan's arms while he talks with Kazumi. He reveals that Pheles felt bad for not letting Wilhelmina come with her. Because Johan does not have the Midnight Lost Child anymore, he is just a Torch, and wants to pass on his hope, hinting that this was his plan. Pheles wakes up they approach Kazumi, but disappears as Kazumi wakes up from the dream. Yuji uses her memory to revive Yukari Hirai and to restore order in Misaki City.

Keisaku is Eita's friend and class-skipping companion. When Margery Daw came to Misaki City, she randomly chose Keisaku and Eita to be her guides to the city. When he and Eita found The Crystal Altar, a magical map to the city that Friagne had been using until his demise, the two often acted as support. Being a member of a wealthy family and independent of his parents, his house becomes a place for Margery to stay. He and Eita both like Margery, but he hides his feelings; although when betrayed by Margery, he displayed emotions even more powerful than Eita's. Keisaku has notably chosen Yuji as a rival, especially after he had learned that Yuji was being trained by Flame Hazes, Shana and Wilhelmina. Though, after several events, he accepted the fact that he does not need to be like Yuji. Instead, he decided to study harder by changing schools, so that he could someday work at the Outlaw to support Margery other than in combat. Later, he is informed by Eita that Margery broke down and is in a coma. He quickly rushes back to Misaki City where he tells Margery that he loves her. The two become intimate, and Keisaku has given Margery a new reason to live. He is one of the characters most changed in the anime adaptation of the novel where he is more sociable and somewhat cheerful, and is friends with Yuji and Ike from the beginning of the story.

Eita is a well-built classmate of Keisaku's. When Margery Daw came to Misaki City, she randomly chose the two to be her guides to the city. When he and Keisaku found The Crystal Altar, a magical map to the city that Friagne had been using until his demise, the two often acted as support. He and Keisaku show respect, admiration and affection towards Margery as an "ane-san" (respectable elder sister), but his feelings are more immediately apparent than Keisaku's. However, he has also shown some obvious affection towards Matake Ogata. Like Keisaku, he is friends with Yuji and Ike from the start in the novel. When a battle takes place at the school festival Matake is serious injured by Margery's rampage while inside the seal. At this sight, Eita begins to cry and scream uncontrollably rushing to her side. Following this Eita decided to keep his distance from the events concerning the Guze and part ways with Satou and Margery.

Hayato, otherwise chiefly known as Ike, has been Yuji's friend since junior high school. He carries the title "Megane-man" ("Glasses Man"), or Four-Eyes in the English version. He is secretly fond of Kazumi Yoshida. However, as Yuji's loyal (and best) friend, he is the one who helps her to show her feelings toward Yuji. He often gives Kazumi advice. He rarely competes with Yuji for her affection, except one time when he invited Kazumi to help him with his student council meetings. Ike is notably intelligent and is often unavailable due to having to study or attending extra classes outside school. During the school festival, he was continually dragged away by Fujiota, a fellow council member. Ike is prone to motion-sickness, and turns pale at the sight of buses. He cannot ride roller-coasters, and even kid rides, although he made it through a Ferris wheel ride when he was in kindergarten.

Ike is notably more emotionally aware than single-minded Yuji. While Yuji's desire to help just about any girl is admirable, he seems unaware that this is a source of heartache for others around him, especially Shana and Kazumi, and Ike is generally the one to point this out to him. This caused a slight problem when it is revealed that Ike also has feelings for Kazumi. At the end of the first season, Ike decides not to hold back where Kazumi was concerned. He even invited her out on Christmas Eve and confessed that he loved her. Ike never found out of Guze's existence that Yuji's involved with.

Matake is Yuji's classmate. She is a strong-willed physically active girl, as well as a bit of a tomboy. She is very good at playing volleyball. She also has feelings for Eita, and worries about his well-being. She gets jealous of Margery Daw because of her closeness to Eita. She and Eita later become a couple. Eita determined to have a normal life with Matake and not tip her about the Crimson Denizens.

In the second season of the anime, the transfer student Fumina Konoe bears an uncanny resemblance to Hecate. She develops a bond to Yuji has Shana and Yoshida on the edge of uneasiness, which lessens slightly after a study session. In episode fifteen, it is revealed that Fumina is in fact a faux vessel created by Hecate, whose purpose had been sent to primarily keep an eye on the Midnight Lost Child and seal the Silver should it attempt to escape. Her secondary purpose was to collect memories of interacting with Yuji and the others. In the last episode of the second season, it seems that the memories and feelings from Fumina Konoe have given Hecate human feelings, causing her to hesitate to fire at Yuji at the last moment. This in turn, helps Yuji and Shana overcome the Taimei Shihen, leaving a confused Hecate to wonder what had overcome her state of mind. In this episode, she is also shown shedding tears.

Yukari is Yuji's classmate. She has dark-colorred hair which has two small ponytails tied up from it. She has a very upbeat personality, and is kind and quick to help others out. In the anime, she loved Hayato Ike, but implies that she also had feelings for Yuji. However, she died when a Rinne appeared on her way home. Shana makes a Torch of Yukari that same day. Unfortunately, her flame burns out on the next day, and she disappeared as a result. Before her flame went out, Yukari became very melancholy and silent. Yuji attempted to give her the best last day of her life, and persuaded Ike to hang out with her. They took a photo together, but Yukari's image fades out when her flame burns out. Her last moment in her life was when she sat on a hill watching the sunset, her favorite view. The fading of her existence teaches Yuji some very valuable lessons about both the world around him, and his own inability to affect it. Shana uses a remnant of Yukari's existence to shift the perception of others' identification of Yukari Hirai to herself (others recognize her as Yukari Hirai, as if Shana had been so all along). At the end of the series after the city has been restored, Yukari reappears into the world.

Sakai family

Chigusa is Yuji's mother. Her husband, Kantaro, works outside the country. Chigusa remains ignorant of Shana and Yuji's true nature, but becomes a source of good advice for Shana on matters where Alastor cannot counsel her. The Crimson Lord himself acknowledges and bows to her wisdom after a phone call between the two of them. Described as a woman who can accept anything, she seems to harbor absolutely no problems with Shana often visiting Yuji under the pretext of "training".

As Shana's affection for Yuji grows, she begins to seek out Chigusa more often for advice or help. Generally, this is in the form of asking her to teach Shana how to make a bento, as she is repeatedly jealous at Kazumi's ability to make Yuji a bento for lunch. Chigusa often coaches Shana through the steps, despite her obvious, if not dangerous, lack of progress. Chigusa may have bitten off more than she can chew when she attempted to teach Wilhelmina Carmel, an even more disastrous cook, which resulted in a rather large mess in the kitchen.

It has been implied that in recent volumes, she was seen pregnant. Also, Kantaro has referred to her past, when she seems to have been raised in an orphanage.

Kantaro is Yuji's father. He first made his appearance in volume nine of the light novels. He usually resides outside Japan, but enjoys making sudden visits to the Sakai household, surprising his family. Despite his skinny figure, his athletic senses are good enough to retaliate a flying kick from Shana without scratch, who was mistaken that he was an enemy (although this particular defense was just a lucky one). His tailing and investigation skills are first-class, so good that even Shana could not follow him. During a plot to save Yuji from being destroyed by Wilhelmina in the novels, he tricks the latter with clever timed exchanges of borrowed mascot suits. He eats an astonishing amount of food, and his eating method is just as absurd.

Kantarō and Chigusa got married when they were students. They got married early because Chigusa became pregnant. He later talks to Kazumi and Shana on a porch, where the two comment how Kantarō and Chigusa are "well-matched" for each other. He describes how Chigusa is always there for him. He then gives them advice about Yūji; to extend their hand so that they can reach out to something.

Miyu is the third and only remaining child of Kantarō and Chigusa Sakai and the younger sister of Yūji Sakai. She was introduced in the last episode of the anime and in the short story Future from volume SIII.

She was born after the last fight in Misaki City between Shana and Yūji, so they never had the chance to see her. Kazumi and Ogata occasionally visited the Sakai residence to take care of Miyu. She was named Miyu because of the "distant sound" that Kantaro and Chigusa heard during the last battle (Shana versus Yūji and Margery Daw versus Sydonay). This was most likely when Yūji commanded the residents of Misaki to watch and remember the scene. Her name may imply 'the third child who will live long'.

Mystes

Tenmoku Ikko is a Mystes known as "the worst Mystes in history" or "monster torch", he is a huge man wearing samurai armor and one-eyed Oni mask. Tenmoku Ikko was an ancient swordsmith who became Mystes on his own will so that he could find the strongest being worthy of entrusting the treasure Nietono no Shana, the greatest sword that he ever forged with the aid of a Crimson Lord, who had shared a wish to create a weapon paralleled by none. Tenmoku Ikko ironically reverses the usual order of things by consuming a Crimson Denizen, possibly to empower himself - or simply to end an annoying interference with Tenmoku Ikko's desire to face 'a strong one'. After Shana defeats him with a daring attack, she receives the Nietono no Shana. He is not seen again until Shana is being held captive inside Serei-den, where Shana calls out for her Nietono no Shana. Tenmoku Ikko then fights his way through the palace and returns the sword to his master.

 / "Eternal Lover"

The former Mystes of the Midnight Lost Child. While he was an infant, Pheles murdered his father who tried to sacrifice Johan for a useless Power of Unrestraint to gain eternal youth. Pheles fled with Johan from his home and wandered the world together since. As she raised Johan, Pheles had expected his heart to become corrupted in the same manner as his father when she fulfilled his wishes and desires. It seemed by chance that when Johan reached a later age, he asked for one thing that caught Pheles off guard: herself, an indication that Johan had fallen in love with Pheles. Upon the beginnings of the Appointed Couple, the Midnight Lost Child was created to ensure eternal life to Johan and Pheles ceased consuming humans. After his rebirth as a Mystes, he trained himself and became a powerful master of the Power of Unrestraint, enhanced with his ability to sense the power of existence. Johan with Pheles are referred to as the "Engaged Link". He even came up with a way to heal Sabrac's Stigma in the middle of a fight. Johan was fatally injured in the battle with Sabrac so Pheles decided to seal him inside the Midnight Lost Child but before it could escape the battle, Sabrac cast a part of "Psalm of Grand Order" into it too. Reiji Maigo then transported itself into Yūji Sakai, who was up until now possessing it.

Johan was awakened by Pheles in her twister after Kazumi summoned her to the battlefield. He appears in front of Yūji and places his palm against his, introducing himself to Yūji and the Snake of the Festival. He thanks Kazumi for making Pheles grant his wish. He reveals that Pheles felt bad for not letting Wilhelmina come with her, and that he has a message for Kazumi. Because he does not have the Midnight Lost Child anymore, he is just a Torch, and wants to pass on his hope, hinting that this was his plan. Johan says that they had taken advantage of the God of Creation's ambition and guided events to turn up as they have. Later, it is revealed that Johan and Pheles used their Power of Existence to bore Justus, the Heir to Both Worlds, and that Johan's message to Kazumi was for Wilhelmina to take care of Justus.

Flame Hazes
 / 

Margery is a tall, "well-endowed" and mature blond Flame Haze with a drinking habit. She uses the book Grimoire, which is the divine vessel through which Marchosias, to whom she is bound, expresses his will. Her specialty seems to be Power of Unrestraint, and her main powers focus around chanting spells and turning into a werewolf. Eita and Keisaku look up to her because she saved their lives once. Her reason for becoming a Flame Haze is to get revenge on a Denizen with a silver-colored flame (who is somehow linked to the Reiji Maigo within Yuji). Even before her installation as a Flame Haze, she lived only for vengeance. She was once a daughter of a landlord in medieval times, but after countless betrayals, her father was killed, and she had ended up in a brothel. She gained a chance to avenge her misery and humiliation, only to see her enemies destroyed by the Silver. Her fury at having her sole remaining reason for living stolen attracted the attention of Marchosias. In the anime, Margery's focus gradually shifts from fighting simply to eradicate Crimson Denizens to fighting to protect the Balance. She notes her fighting skills are no lesser for the shift in focus. In the light novels, not only does Margery lose a battle with the Silver, but she later realizes that the Silver had been acting on her wish for revenge for her life of misery prior to becoming a Flame Haze before she is nearly killed by Yuji. After learning this, Margery breaks down into a fit of screaming and falls into a coma. Margery eventually recovers when Keisaku kisses and confesses his love for her, giving her a new reason for living.

 / 

Wilhelmina is a young lady who wears a maid's uniform all the time. She is bound to Tiamat, whose will resides in the divine vessel Persona, which shifts forms between a headband, and a mask when in battle. During the great war, Persona's shape was a tiara. Her title's meaning is like the term for a player (in chess) who can predict moves far ahead.

She is one of the great Flame Haze from the age of the great war, fighting alongside her friend, Mathilde Saint-Omer (the previous "Flame-Haired Red-Hot-Eyed Hunter"). Together, they are like the counterpart of the "Pair of Wings" combination between the Crimson Denizens Merihim and Illuyankas. Her ability is the power to control an infinite number of ribbons which appear from around her. Wilhelmina, who always speaks in an overly formal and polite manner, has nearly no expression. She's very skillful in many things, including singing and house chores, and is the one who took care of Shana during the girl's training at Tendōkyū. Cooking, however, is one of her weaknesses; this was made even more evident in the second season, after her attempts at cooking crashed Chigusa's kitchen.

Wilhelmina dislikes Yuji as an overprotective mother might dislike her daughter's boyfriend, and constantly refers to him as "the Mystes", though later on, she occasionally refers to him by his proper name. She has, in the anime, advocated killing him so as to keep the Reiji Maigo out of the hands of the Bal Masqué and had to be stopped from performing the deed herself twice by Shana. In the anime's second season, Wilhelmina has begun to, more or less, accept Yuji's presence, if not his influence on Shana, and, at Shana's request, becomes Yuji's training partner when Shana is otherwise not available.

In the light novels, Yuji nearly kills Wilhelmina with the Blutsauger in a wild rage, when she tried to make Shana give up on Yuji by force. At that moment, Tiamat called her partner "Princess!" implying that Wilhelmina was born to a Royal family. Wilhelmina always uses de arimasu, the uncontracted form of desu normally seen only in writing, to end her sentences.

 / 

Khamsin is the Flame Haze contracted to Behemoth. Although he is one of the oldest Flame Haze, perhaps even thousands of years old, he appears as a ten-year-old Middle-Eastern boy. He was formerly a prince who had dreamed of becoming a great warrior, but when he became a Flame Haze to fend off the Denizen, he was forgotten by everyone as the price for the contract. Although a Flame Haze, Khamsin's primary function is not that of combating Tomogara, but rather acting as a tuner--dispelling the distortion caused by battles between the Flame Haze and Tomogara. Despite this, Khamsin does have combat capability; specifically, he has the ability to create and move stone golem-like creatures and control stones. He is very powerful, but is more famous for the accuracy, or lack thereof, in his attacks. In the anime, Khamsin and Behemoth are collectively called 'the geezers' by Margery Daw. Tellingly, the once battle-happy Flame Haze expressed some uneasiness and reluctance at the notion that they might have to join in battle against the Crimson Denizens. He is fatally wounded by explosions caused by the death of the Seeking Researcher in the final stages of the Second Great War and collapses. He is then surrounded by Wilhelmina, Shana, Margery, the remaining three of The Four Gods of Earth as well as Kazumi. After a heartfelt exchange and some final words to his contractor, Behemoth, he passes away from his wounds.

 / 

Also nicknamed Mother Courage due to her kindness and motherly figure to the other Flame Hazes. She is a Great War veteran and the supreme commander of the Flame Haze Army. Despite her calm outward appearance, she is a very powerful Flame Haze, and brandishes a purple flame which resemble bolts of lightning, She is bound to Takemikazuchi. Sophie met Shana in Eastern Europe and taught the young girl about the manner of the Flame Haze at the present time and how a girl should behave.

 / 

Ernest is assigned by Sophie as the commander of the Tokyo Outlaw Headquarters during the Second Great War. He has the ability to change his body's density to hide or pass through solid objects. Despite being a powerful and renowned Flame Haze for decades, he rarely fights head-on and prefers to deceive and ambush his enemies. He also dislikes being called by his first name. He is bound to Brigid.

 / 

Rebecca is an old friend of Wilhelmina. She has a strong sense of duty as she chose to help Wilhelmina in her quest to save Shana instead of aiding the Outlaw branch at Tokyo. She is rowdy and that explosive part of her personality is manifested in her Flame Haze ability to shoot explosive bursts of Existence or being able to blow something up from underneath by remote explosion. She is bound to Balar.

 / 

She was Sale Habichtsburg's pupil and now, at present, is his partner who rides around on a large green arrow at blinding speeds. Both Chiara and Sale joined Shana and the others in the battle against Bal Masque in Misaki City.

 / 

Sale's ability as a Flame Haze is manipulation of invisible strings that occupy his surroundings. He then uses the vessels Länge and Saite to manipulate those strings. He and Chiara shared fame as Flame Haze that even reached fellow Flame Haze Yurī Chvojka.

 / 

A young-looking man with blonde hair that covers his eyes and dressed in a safari explorers outfit, Francois was a scout during the Great War and during the Second Great War also does battlefield and terrain analysis for Sophie. His ability over water allows him to use rivers for long distance communication or use snow or rain to his advantage, giving him limited control over the weather. He is contracted to Grogach.

 / 

East Edge is the Native-American Flame Haze who runs the Outlaws disguised as a news agency in New York and took care of Yuri. He despises the term "New World" named by Europeans. He is one of the four powerful Flame Haze called "The Four Gods of Earth", who had protected the continent for centuries. In nineteenth century, the Four Gods and their comrades had plotted to destroy the government of the United States to liberate their fellow natives who had suffered from the invasion of white people. Many Flame Haze stood up to stop the plot, leading to a civil war between two groups of Flame Haze, but this cost dearly as the balance of the world had collapsed and Denizens were able to act as they pleased without restraint. The Four Gods had no choice but to abandon the plan, along with the passion to protect the world that expanded by sacrificing their fellow people and the great earth. With a suggestion from a tuner, they each became the keeper of the four Outlaws in four major cities of the North and South America.

 / 

Yuri is an inexperienced sixteen-year-old Flame Haze boy, who wore an unnecessary pair of eyeglasses. He has power to control small animals and insects as a messengers, spies, and measurement, or wrap himself inside them and fly like cannonball. He was a Ukrainian immigrant, whose ship was attacked by one of the Krakens (sea-bound Denizens) during the voyage to America. Near his death he made the contract with Valac and defeated the denizen, but failed to save his family and other passengers. After reaching America, he worked under East Edge. Since he completed his vengeance so quickly, he could not develop the hatred or passion vital for the cause of Flame Haze and he lacked the coolness and rationality needed for survival. He even wished to protect people with his own life, which other Flame Hazes had thought of this idea dangerous, especially East Edge who had forbidden him to engage in combat with enemies.

He met Margery, who had her first contact with Annaberg and Sydonay, and wished to assist her, but was rejected. Still, he jumped into the battle, saving Margery and had successfully defeated Annaberg. With little energy left, he tried to fight Sydonay, but took a fatal blow instead, and caught in the crossfire between him and Margery, Yuri perished.

 / 

The military commander in the Flame Haze Army during the Second Great War and the one who coined the name "Flame Haze Army" during the First Great War, he is a stoic man garbed in military clothing who has a large scar covering the left side of his face including his eye. He's been an active Flame Haze for over 600 years. His ability allows him to erect great stone structures such as bridges or castles in short time. He is bound to Zirnitra. He is fatally wounded defending an objective during the Second Great war, and collapse against a stone wall. After an exchange between him and Zirnitra, calling him his "Brother in Arms" He succumbs to his wounds.

Lords of the Crimson Realm
 / 

Marchosias is the Crimson Lord to whom Margery Daw is contracted. He expresses his will through the divine vessel Grimoire, which takes the form of a book. He talks wildly, makes comments without remorse, and often teases Margery, and in return earning a retaliatory punch. He does genuinely care about her, however, perhaps not in the form of friendship but as a companion in battle.

 / 

Tiamat is the female Crimson Lord to whom Wilhelmina is bound. She is described by her own Flame Haze as a most unsociable entity; she is taciturn and to the point, saying nothing more than what is necessary, usually in a monotone, betraying no emotion regardless of the situation. In the novels, her lines are almost always written in four kanji letters (yojijukugo), with no hiragana or katakana.

 / 

Behemoth is the Crimson Lord whose will resides in the bracelet Khamsin wears. He speaks like an old man. With his Flame Haze, his mission seems not to be the protection the balance of worlds through hunting the Denizens, but instead by re-tuning places where the distortion is too great, such as Misaki city, where Friagne had created so many Torches in his preparation for the City Devourer.

 / 

Takemikazuchi is a Crimson Lord who is contracted with Sophie. He expresses his will through a divine vessel called the Donner, which takes the form of a blue star-shaped cross on Sophie's headdress.

 / 

Brigid is a Crimson Lord who is contracted with Ernest. She expresses her will through a divine vessel called the Ambrosia, which takes the form of a red flower accessory attached to Ernest's white suit.

 / 

Balar is a Crimson Lord who is contracted with Rebecca. He expresses his will through a divine vessel called the Cruach, which takes the form of a golden bracelet worn on Rebecca's right wrist.

 / 

Outreniaia and Vetcherniaia are a Crimson Lord with dual personalities contracted with Chiara. Her choice of Divine Vessels are also arrowheads like Karl, but she prefers to use it as hair accessories instead. In the battle, the arrowheads become the tips of the aurora-colored bow which is used to shoot the signature Unrestricted Spells.

 / 

Gizo is a Crimson Lord who is contracted with Sale. His Vessels are pair of marionette control bars, Länge and Saite. Formerly, they were, when unused, placed in the holsters but now Sale uses the hardskin belt crossed in the hips.

 / 
The Crimson Lord Francois contracted to, she resides in the Vessel Splet, a giant urn that Francois carries on his back.

 / 

Quetzalcóatl is the Crimson Lord who is contracted to East Edge. He speaks in a deep and heavy voice through an engraved stone medallion using short two- or three-word sentences.

 / 

Valac is the Crimson Lord who expresses her will through the knife-like vessel Goverla. She speaks rather wearily, yet she looks after her partner Yuri with kindness.

 / 
The Crimson Lord who is bound to Samuel Demantius. He takes the form of a small silver chalice attached to a small thread, much like a necklace.

Rinne and Denizens of the Crimson Realm
Pheles / 

Once a trickster who toyed with the life of a mad alchemist, Pheles is a lord who fell in love with a human, Johan the alchemist's son. In order to stay with him forever, they created the most precious treasure in Guze, a Treasure that can grant eternity to the Mystes bearing it: the Midnight Lost Child. Due to the Midnight Lost Child, she does not need to consume other humans' power of existence; she can get enough to survive from Johan without him being in danger of disappearing. Due to a fight against the Bal Masque's assassin Sabrac that severely wounded Johan, she sealed her lover into the Midnight Lost Child. She was unaware that Sabrac had also placed the Silver into the treasure tool simultaneously. The Midnight Lost Child was then lost, so now she searches for him everywhere with a Power of Unrestraint “The Wheel of Wind” (Kaze no Tenrin), a guiding beacon that becomes a duplicate of her own when the target is found. Johan commandeers Yuji's body to persuade her from sacrificing the current Mystes to bring him back and Pheles agrees to her lover's wish before leaving for parts unknown. Before she left, Pheles gives Yoshida a cross treasure tool called the Giralda.

She is friends with Wilhelmina who once she had saved from the trap set by the Denizen Lord Sabrac. She does not appear in the first season of the anime but appears in the second season around the end of episode twelve amid her search for the Midnight Lost Child. She tries to free Johan the first time, only to be interrupted by Margery's berserk rage as well as the coordinated actions of Wilhelmina and Shana. During the creation of Xanadu as Kazumi activates the Giralda. Pheles appears before the floating Kazumi in the twister that was formed. She explains that Giralda is specifically designed for human use, and that humans can only use Treasure Tools when they are sacrificing themselves, revealing that Kazumi will not die. She says it's a miracle that Kazumi had summoned her. Pheles informs Yūji, Shana, Wilhelmina, and Sydonay that she will change the current situation. She says sorry to Wilhelmina before going to Yūji. She distracts him with Kazumi's body, grasping his hand. She twists it around his back and tells Johan to wake up. Pheles blocks Shana from interfering with her wind. When Johan calls out to her, Pheles rushes over to him, leaving Kazumi with Shana. They embrace, as Pheles tells Johan how hard she has worked. They activate an Unrestricted Spell that smashes into the river, allowing the Hyakki Yakō's van to drive up it, Pheles as well as Johan and an unconscious Kazumi, enter.

Justus is the child created from the combined existences of Pheles and Johan. He is taken care of by Wilhelmina at Xanadu. He is the first descendant born from a Crimson Denizen and a human, which gives him the title "Heir to Both Worlds". They entrust the flask that would become Justus to Kazumi, who takes care of it until its completion and gives the newborn Justus to Wilhelmina. The Xanadu ceremony summons the Crimson God Shaher into this world. She announces the news of an extraordinary existence born from both worlds to everyone before disappearing. Brought to Xanadu, Justus is mainly taken care of by Wilhelmina and Rebecca within Tendōkyū. Shana occasionally visits and Justus views her like an older sister.

 Lamis / 
 
Lamis is the Torch of an old man under the control of a Crimson Denizen as means to travel in secrecy. Lamis collects the Power of Existence from torches on the verge of flickering out and is a rare one among Denizens due to respecting the balance and does not simply feed on people. As the nickname 'Corpse Retriever' indicates, he only draws power from torches that would perish any moment anyway. Lamis is a master wizard, renowned for past feats of creating the most prominent Power of Unrestraint (Jizai Hou), including the Seal itself. He is an old acquaintance of Alastor, but does not take part in battles.

The name of the female Crimson Denizen residing within Lamis is "Rasen no Fuukin (The Spiral Organ)"; in the past, she used the name Leanan-sidhe, and assumed the form of a young girl who fell in love with a human painter, who unfortunately caught her consuming humans one day, a possible reason that made her stop eating humans later on. She was captured and imprisoned by a Crimson Lord for so many years that upon being released, she found out that the painter, who still loved her, had died of old age. He had drawn a picture of the Spiral Organ, but it had been damaged beyond repair, so now she seeks to gather enough power of existence to hopefully one day activate a Power of Unrestraint that would restore the painting.

Friagne / 

Friagne, also known as "Flame Haze Murderer", takes his name's meaning as his hobby, "treasure hunter". He is a powerful Tomogara arrayed in robes of untarnishable white. Unlike other Tomogara, he does not associate with the organizations like Bal Masqué. He has very intimate relationship with his favorite doll, Marianne. He came to Misaki City to perform a notorious Power of Unrestraint "City Devourer" to gain the power of existence enough to make Marianne a fully independent being, instead of a Rinne which needs to depend on its master just to exist. He has a vast collection of Treasure Items (powerful tools or implements contained within Mystes), pictured as mountain of treasure in an extra story in Guren (Itou Noizi artbook), of which all are useless. This is also the reason for his having the largest collection of hougu: most are not the highly sought battle-use Hougu. He later meets his end at the hands of Shana. In all media except for the anime film, he was incinerated by the wrath of Alastor, who had materialized when the enraged Friagne shot Shana with the Triggerhappy which could not destroy her body like it did with many other Flame Hazes.

Marianne is one of Friagne's Rinne servants. Friagne seems to treasure her a bit more than is healthy for him. She usually takes the form of a doll. In order to buy time to complete the sequence of the "City Devourer", she fought Shana and exploded for the love of her master.

Sorath / 

Sorath is an extravagant occidental looking boy with beautiful hair, continuously perplexed despite being Tiriel's elder brother, and is subject to the passion and whims of his younger sister. With the "Butsuyoku" (an arms type hougu) he uses "the olfactory sense of desire" to seek powers of existence. He is armed with a sword called "Blutsauger" (German for "blood sucker"), which is capable of damaging anything that it touches if a user channels power of existence into it. He is obsessed with, and is searching for the "Nietono no Shana" (Shana's Sword). His obsession with the sword proved to be his undoing in the end.

  / 

Tiriel is Sorath's younger sister. Though being the younger one, she thinks and acts in a much more mature way and teaches everything to her almost will-less brother. Tiriel has stated that her only goal in life is to fulfill every desire of her brother and to protect him. She will do so without regrets, even if it means sacrificing her power of existence, or even her own life. But she is also a very jealous girl, strangling Sorath near death when he had spoken of names of other females, such as "Hecate". She can use a Power of Unrestraint called "Cradle Garden" with the aid of a Treasure Tool, which alters a Seal, so its area becomes an advantage to the siblings. Shana was disgusted with their way of expressing love, yet she was greatly moved by Tiriel's self-sacrifice, learning from her the "Uncontrollable feeling".

Merihim a.k.a. Shiro / 

Merihim is one of the nine lords that gathered under , the greatest Denizen organization that rivaled Bal-Masque, led by the late Lord  Asiz. Merihim and the dragon shaped Lord  Illuyanka were feared as the "Pair of Wings", being the most powerful subordinates of Asiz. It was then when he gained the title . Wilhelmina loves him, but Merihim is crazily in love with Mathilde, who in turn, loved Alastor. To fulfill his promise to the woman he loved, he changed shape into the skeleton Shana knew as Shiro and trained the next successor of "Flame-Haired Blazing-Eyed Hunter" title. His promise is his only motivation, however.

  / 

Mare is the antagonist in the Shakugan no Shana PlayStation 2 game. Mare also appears in the second season of the anime, where she uses a hougu to place Yuji into a "transient yet eternal" dream world where he relives events from his past as if they were happening all over again.

In episode 12 and 13, Mare seems to have a connection with Sabrac.

Annaberg / 

Annaberg is a Denizen who is fascinated by human civilization and creations, yet is bent on destroying them in order to accelerate the speed of evolution. He has unique appearance as his head is a round pressure gauge and his fingers are like a poking stick, and he wears a trenchcoat and a soft hat. He can create steam from his sleeves, which conceals one's presence or the power of existence, though this skill can backfire on himself allowing his enemy to make a surprise attack.
He appeared in New York in 1930's, with Sydonay as his bodyguard, planning to destroy the Empire State Building, but was stopped by Margery and defeated by Yuri.

Bal Masqué
After his defeat by Flame Hazes, it is led by three powerful figures called the Trinity. Since then, the Bal Masqué stayed low and became an organization to support Denizens, like Outlaw does with Flame Hazes. Their goal is to accomplish the "Grand Order", and the Power of Unrestraint called the "Psalm of Grand Order" and the Midnight Lost Child, which resides in Yuji, are the keys vital to their plot. The subordinate members of Bal Masqué are largely classified into three types of functions; the combatants called Wanderers, the trackers and scouts called Jaegers, and the messengers called Heralds.

Hecate / 

Hecate is one of the Trinity of the Bal Masqué, entitled as "the Priestess". She also controls the movements of Serei-den, Bal Masqué's base. A small pale girl with white cape and hat wielding a staff-like treasure tool, Trigon, she does not speak much. Sydonay seems to care for her a lot. Bel Peol always mentions her having "eternal existence". Her position is very important with respect to what the Bal Masqué plans to do with the Midnight Lost Child, since she is the one who can take the power of the Midnight Lost Child and send it out to everything in Seireiden.

Hecate is a sad, quiet character, who has taken up the habit of prayer - despite having no one to pray to and despite Bel Peol considering it an odd thing to do - and frequently laments that she is 'empty'. In the light novels, it is implied that Hecate is praying to the Bal Masqué's god, the Snake of the Festival (God of Creation). In contrast to her counterpart in the anime, the light novels depict Hecate as a cold and feared leader that even the entire Bal Masqué itself fear her. She has hobby of trekking in mountain tops, yet she despises mountain climbers who litter her favorite sites, so she slaughters them on sight. She is extremely skilled in combat using Aster, a Power of Unrestraint which shoots energy beams like meteor shower, and is capable in grappling as well which equals to Shana's skill. She has a flute that can summon dragons of blue flame body. She also plays this flute when announcing the end of Serei-den's anchoring.
 
In the anime, Hecate synchronized with Yuji, allowing her to draw on his sense of self to fill the void inside of her. The purpose of this synchronization was more sinister, however; once midnight struck, the Midnight Lost Child attempted to restore the power of existence of its bearer. Since Yuji and Hecate were synchronized at the time, the Midnight Lost Child started pouring out an infinite amount of power in an attempt to fill Hecate's capacity which is infinite. She considers the feelings that she gets from synchronizing with others are hers and no longer from their owners, much like a Torch being the remainder of their original human self takes over its identity. She was defeated when Yuji points out that the feelings, memories and sense of self that she is reveling about are not hers but his. When he says that Hecate is just as empty as she was before synchronizing and she cannot possibly fill her sense of self by drawing it from others(i.e.: questioning her "where her unique self"), she is forced to face the void that lies inside of her and screams in horror, losing control of the synchronization, Serei-den and herself as well as discharging massive amounts of power of existence she stored while synchronized with Yuji which could destroy an entire city requiring Sydonay to save her. As the Snake of the Festival begins to create Xanadu, he bids farewell to Hecate as she becomes the sacrifice. Hecate appears before Sydonay in a dreamlike afterlife and is surprised that he had died. He tells her that he wanted to die. They hold hands and walk towards a white light, waiting for the day the Trinity and their leader are together once more.
 
  / 

Sydonay is one of the Trinity of the Bal Masqué, and is known as the "General". For some time, he stayed outside of the Organization, because he wanted the freedom to do what he wanted to, including serving various Denizens as a bodyguard (just for fun). He also appreciates human civilization enough to enjoy smoking cigarettes. However, after finding the Midnight Lost Child, he has assumed his former position. He usually appears as a tall, well-built man wearing a pair of sunglasses and dark colored suits. However, he has great shape-shifting abilities and, unlike other Denizens, can change into various chimeras without the use of spells. With this weapon in hand, he leads an army of Denizens and Lords, destroying major Outlaws throughout Europe and China. Sydonay and Margery have fought one another in the past, as Sydonay describes their battle in the current events as a reunion. He cares deeply for Hecate, coming to her rescue even when in the middle of a battle (as he abandons his fight with Margery to save Hecate from being burned). He chooses to stay behind when the gateway to Xanadu open, and is subsequently killed by Margery Daw. He meets Hecate in a dream-like afterlife where she expresses surprise that he had died. He tells her that he wanted to die. They hold hands and walk towards a white light, waiting for the day that the Trinity and their leader are together once more.

Bel Peol / 

Bel Peol is one of the Trinity of the Bal Masqué, entitled as the "Strategist". She takes the form of a woman with three eyes, but has an eye-patch covering her right eye. A scheming character that would have no qualms in manipulating her unsuspecting subordinates and sending them off to die. Apparently, she also has a gift for engendering loyalty in her subordinates, such as Vine, as she is capable of inspiring them to perform obviously dangerous tasks on her behalf. Her strategic skills are balanced by a considerable aptitude for combat.

In the novel, Bel Peol's catchphrase is "Much things in life don't come as one pleases". Unlike most Denizens, who live their lives as they will, Bel Peol is exceptional in that she enjoys the obstacles that come against her plans, delighting in the challenges they pose, feeling that it is the overcoming of such obstacles that makes life interesting.

Fecor / 

Fecor is a Lord who looks like a feeble middle-aged businessman with stereotypical features of devils, such as horns, a pair of bat's wings and a long tail. He usually acts as a guide of Seireiden, greeting Denizens and Lords at the gate. Being polite and timid, young Denizens like Vine had thought of him as a mere guide; but in fact, Fecor is Bel Peol's right-hand man, who is in charge of the Seireiden's defense. Despite his looks and behaviour, he uses very powerful and deadly "defensive" Power of Unrestraint called Magnesia, which creates storm of heavy particles. The particles are controlled at Fecor's will, its streams inflict heavy blows upon the enemies in spite of its true purpose as defensive maneuver. They can also be concentrated to form giant objects to crush the enemies.
He appeared in Misaki city as Hecate's bodyguard, fending off Flame Hazes away from her with his power.
He was killed by Tenmoku Ikko when he was guarding Bal Masque and the Dimensional Gate when Yuji and the Trinity were in the gate.

Sabrac / 

Sabrac was a powerful Crimson Lord who was victorious in numerous battles against the Flame Haze. He was an assassin, who worked for hire, but chose only those targets he deemed interesting. He liked to make long fancy speeches, and while he may have seemed to be dissatisfied, it was rare to see him lose his temper. He collected bladed weapons of various kinds whether they were Treasure Tools or not, and he used them in fights. He and Dantalion loathed each other, because the latter transfigured Sabrac's Treasure blade Hystorix into a blade-spinning drill-like contraption without permission, and Dantalion was greatly offended by Sabrac's subsequent insults.
During combat, his first strike was notorious for both its stealth, as even the most sensitive Flame Haze and Denizens were unable to sense its imminent arrival, and that it could be cast at an unlimited number of targets, with each strike hitting with maximum power. His Power of Unrestraint, Stigma, caused all wounds he inflicted to increase in severity over time. This spell, created for battle, was fatal for most targets, and even if victim was strong, the power would usually give Sabrac victory because of the debilitating effects of the wounds.
Sabrac was actually an unbalanced Lord with a ridiculously gigantic body, yet with the range of sight, hearing, and other senses of a human. He hid his body by blending into the area he had chosen for battlefield, enabling him to launch a surprise attack without being detected. The humanoid Sabrac that appeared after the first strike possessed Sabrac's mind and was almost invulnerable because it is created from only a small part of his overall body. As such, it could recover from any damage.
Hired by Bal Masqué, he hunted down the Engage Link and cast a part of "Psalm of Grand Order" into Reiji Maigo. He was again hired by Bel Peol and went to Misaki City, badly wounding the Flame Haze by surprise attack and he then set another part of the "Psalm" into Yuji. But his arrogance allowed Wilhelmina to cure the wounds inflicted by Stigma, and Yuji was able to deduce Sabrac's true nature as well as come up with a plan to defeat him by levitating a few city blocks of the city and thereby severing the connection between Sabrac's humanoid part and his true body. This cut off his power of recovery and his ability to retreat. Although Sabrac was defeated, he managed to escape to Seireiden with the power of Gordian Knot. Later, Sabrac was shown speaking with Bel Peol and announcing that he no longer has a reason to have his base at Seireiden. In volume nineteen, Sabrac is destroyed, falling into the gap between worlds after losing the will to fight upon seeing the Snake of the Festival's true form and refusing Bel Peol's aid.

Dantalion / 

Dantalion is a stereotypical mad scientist. Dantalion is not liked, even hated by most Denizens, among the Bal Masque, because he is willing to perform research on their own people and also being responsible for an experiment which created some of the powerful Flame Haze. Among the Trinity, Bel Peol does not like or trust him and Sydonay hates him, but somehow Hecate seems close to him, even calling him "ojisama" (the greeting toward uncles or respectable seniors) and protecting him from repercussions with the higher-ups. He does not care who he works with, Denizens, humans, or even Flame Haze, as long as if it's necessary to do whatever that he's interested in, even ruining them at the end is an option. He created a lot of gadgets, from creatures like the "Rinne" Cantate Domino 28 (a parody of Tetsujin 28) to huge steam locomotives. He's also notorious for conducting meaningless experiments, for the sake of conducting experiments, which in the end serves no actual useful purpose but to cause exaggerated alert to others. He really likes experiments that would be perceived as impossible and gets really excited over the details. He hates shiitake mushrooms and being told he's wrong (mostly by Domino, on whom Dantalion vents his frustration by pinching his cheeks with a giant pair of tongs), but he hates Bel Peol and the Flame Haze "Puppeteer of Devilish Skills" Sale Habichtsburg, one of his artificially created Flame Haze, even more. Towards the end of the 2nd Great War, Sale flung one of Dantalion's own creations, a mass-produced robot primed to explode with enough force to wipe out everything and anything utterly in a 30 meter radius, under the Tower where the creation of Xanadu was taking place. Dantalion believed he would be able to get away because he had an escape route, only for Para of Hyakki Yakou to have unintentionally deactivated it. The robot exploded, effectively killing Dantalion and Domino in the blast.

Vine / 

Vine is a Jaeger and a subordinate of Bel Peol. Depicted as a motorcycle-rider, with only his eyes visible due to his bodysuit clothing. He brought the Gordian Knot, which can activate a large-scale destructive Power of Unrestraint, to the Palace of Heaven's Road to stop the exaltation of the new Flame-Haired Blazing-Eyed Hunter.

Orgon / 

Orgon is a Wanderer and a subordinate of Bel Peol. Depicted with a transparent body in an old-French royal costume. Sent on a different mission with respect to Vine, but the destination is still The Palace of Heaven's Road, only to meet his fearful doom when facing his old rival - Rainbow Wings, Merihim/Shiro.

Zarovee / 

The Jaeger who looks like an old man with a gentle smile. He can split into five duplicates, each wearing scarves in red, blue, yellow, green, and pink (the colors, numbers and their exaggerated moves are parody of Super Sentai/Power Rangers), though he/they is/are extremely weak, possessing so little power that equals a Torch that neither Yuji nor the Flame Hazes had noticed his/their presence. He/they abducts Yuji by threatening to consume the citizens of Misaki city, in order to lure the Flame Hazes into a trap. But Yuji takes him/them by surprise, destroying one of the duplicates with a fireball and placing the hostages under a Seal. Immobilized by fear, the rest of the Zarovee were killed off in a matter of moments by Yuji wielding Blutsauger.

Bifrons / 

The Wanderer with a chimney-like body, insectoid legs and a burning head that resembles a torture device, which makes him look like a giant, disfigured candle. He wraps himself in a hougu Tarnkappe, which grants him the stealth in exchange for speed and mobility. He is skilled in destroying the enemies from a long distance with projectiles made of surrounding rubble, shot from his cannon-like body. He usually works with Zarovee, making contact by cellphone. When Yuji prevented their scheme, Bifrons fires upon Shana, only to have the cannonball shot down. He then got caught in the resulting explosion, barely surviving; but Sabrac, who had used him and Zarovee as a decoy, forced him to shoot a cannonball with full power and Bifrons perished.

Reception

References

External links
 Official website 

Shakugan no Shana
Characters